Olga Zubarry (30 October 1929 – 15 December 2012) was a classic Argentine actress who appeared in film between 1943 and 1997. She made over 60 appearances in film, spanning 6 decades of Argentine cinema, but is best known for her work during the Golden Age of Argentine Cinema. Throughout the course of her career, she received four Silver Condor Awards, two Martín Fierro Awards, a Konex Foundation Award and several others for her films and television performances. She is credited with starring in the first film in Argentina which featured nudity, though only her back was shown and she stated repeatedly that she wore a flesh-colored mesh and was not truly nude.

Biography
Olga Adela Zubiarriaín was born on 30 October 1929 in the Buenos Aires neighborhood of Parque de los Patricios. She attended 3 years at the Liceo Nacional de Señoritas Nº1 José Figueroa Alcorta, but quit school when her acting career began.

She started as an extra at Lumiton studios in 1943 in the movie Safo, historia de una pasión directed by Carlos Hugo Christensen and starring Mecha Ortiz and Roberto Escalada. In 1944 she starred in La pequeña señora de Pérez with Mirtha Legrand and Juan Carlos Thorry. Her rise to fame occurred with the film adaptation (El ángel desnudo) of the novel Frau Elsie, by Arthur Schnitzler. Often billed as the first nude film in Argentina, in reality, the film showed only her bare back, which she claimed was not nude, but was covered with flesh-colored mesh. Zubarry won the 1946 Silver Condor Award of the Film Critics Association for Best New Actress for "El ángel desnudo".

In 1950, she made Yo quiero una mujer así for Bolívar Films in Venezuela, directed by Juan Carlos Thorry and in 1951, was in El extraño caso del hombre y la bestia, an adaptation of Robert Louis Stevenson's the Strange Case of Dr Jekyll and Mr Hyde, which was directed by Mario Soffici. She starred with Nathan Finch, in the 1953 film El Vampiro Negro directed by Uruguayan Román Viñoly Barreto, which was Viñoly's remake of the classic M by Fritz Lang. Zubarry won the Film Critics Association Silver Condor Award for Best Actress for her performance in "El vampiro negro".

In 1955 she played the main character of the same name in Marianela, under director Julio Porter. It won herthe Film Critics Association Silver Condor Award for Best Actress of 1955.  In 1959 she starred in La sangre y la semilla, a historical film set in 1870 during the War of the Triple Alliance and shot in Itauguá and Capiatá, Paraguay.  In 1961 she appeared in the role of "Salui" in "Hijo de hombre", one of her personal favorites, which was an adaptation of the novel of the same name by Paraguayan writer Augusto Roa Bastos and directed by Lucas Demare and with Spanish actor Francisco Rabal. She won a "Concha de Oro" (Golden Shell) at the San Sebastian Festival for her work on the film.

Zubarry appeared in A hierro muere in 1962 with Alberto de Mendoza, Invasión by writer Jorge Luis Borges (1969), Crecer de golpe (1976), ¿Somos? (1982) and Plaza de almas (1997). In her career, she made over 60 films.

Beginning in the early 1970s, she started doing television. Her television debut was with the series La comedia de la noche, and she followed that with Alta comedia, Nosotros y los miedos, Situación límite, Atreverse, El precio del poder, El Sillón de Rivadavia and "Fulanas y menganas". She earned two Martín Fierro Awards, one in 1972 for "Alta Comedia" and one in 1988 for "De Fulanas y Menganas". In 1991, Zubarry received a Diploma of Merit from the Konex Foundation for best dramatic actress in radio and television.

In 1997, she won the Silver Condor Award for Best Supporting Actress for "Plaza de almas" and retired. She said, "You have to retire at the right time." The following year, she won the ACE award for Best Actress for the same film.

Beginning in 1983 she served as matron to two MAMA (Mis Alumnos Más Amigos) homes. The organization is an NGO, which provides homes for street children, giving them a pace to live, study and train for employment. She was also a staunch fan of the Club Atlético Huracán (Hurricane Football Club of Buenos Aires).

She died in Buenos Aires on 15 December 2012, aged 83.

Awards
1946: Silver Condor Award of the Film Critics Association for Best New Actress for "El ángel desnudo"
1953: Silver Condor Award of the Film Critics Association for Best Actress for "El vampiro negro"
1955: Silver Condor Award of the Film Critics Association for Best Actress for "Marianela".
1961: Spanish American Award "Concha de Oro" (Golden Shell) at the San Sebastian Festival for "Hijo de hombre"
1972: Martín Fierro APTRA Award as best actress for "Alta Comedia"
1983: Santa Clara de Asis Award for "El sillón de Rivadavia"
1988: Martín Fierro Protagonista Award for best female performance for "De Fulanas y Menganas"
1991: Konex Diploma of Merit for best dramatic actress in radio and television
1994: Podestá Award for Lifetime Achievement.
1997: Silver Condor Award of the Film Critics Association for best supporting actress for the film "Plaza de almas"
1998: ACE for Best Actress for "Plaza de almas"

Filmography

Films
 
 1943: Safo, historia de una pasión
 1943: Dieciséis años (uncredited)
 1944: La pequeña señora de Pérez
 1945: Las seis suegras de Barba Azul
 1946: El ángel desnudo
 1946: No salgas esta noche
 1946: Adán y la serpiente
 1948: Los pulpos
 1948: La muerte camina en la lluvia
 1949: Yo no elegí mi vida
 1950: Valentina
 1950: Abuso de confianza
 1951: Yo quiero una mujer así
 1951: El extraño caso del hombre y la bestia
 1951: La comedia inmortal
 1951: ¡Qué hermanita!
 1951: El honorable inquilino
 1952: El baldito
 1952: Ellos nos hicieron así
 1953: Mercado negro
 1953: El vampiro negro
 1954: Sucedió en Buenos Aires
 1954: Maleficio
 1954: Tres citas con el destino
 1955: Concierto para una lágrima
 1955: La simuladora
 1955: Vida nocturna
 1955: De noche también se duerme
 1955: Marianela
 1956: Pecadora
 1958: Los dioses ajenos
 1959: En la vía
 1959: La sangre y la semilla
 1959: The Candidate 
 1960: Todo el año es Navidad
 1960: Las furias
 1961: Hijo de hombre
 1962: Misión 52
 1962: A hierro muere
 1964: Proceso a la conciencia or Proceso a la ley
 1965: Los guerrilleros
 1965: Ahorro y préstamo... para el amor
 1968: Amor y un poco más 
 1968: Asalto a la ciudad
 1969: Somos novios
 1969: Invasión
 1970: El hombre del año
 1972: Mi hijo Ceferino Namuncurá
 1973: Si se calla el cantor
 1974: La Mary
 1974: Yo tengo fe
 1974: El Encanto del amor prohibido or Sobre gustos y colores
 1975: El inquisidor de Lima or El inquisidor
 1975: Las procesadas
 1976: Los chicos crecen
 1977: La nueva cigarra
 1977: Crecer de golpe
 1978: Mi mujer no es mi señora
 1980: Desde el abismo
 1982: Los pasajeros del jardín
 1982: ¿Somos?
 1984: Los tigres de la memoria
 1985: Contar hasta diez
 1985: Luna caliente
 1986: En busca del brillante perdido
 1996: Luces de ayer (short)
 1997: El ángel y el escritor (short)
 1997: Plaza de almas

Television
 
 1970 approx.: La comedia de la noche (ciclo de televisión), con el actor Raúl Rossi, dirigida por María Herminia Avellaneda, en Canal 13.
 1971: Narciso Ibáñez Menta presenta: Un hombre extraño (película de televisión, por Canal 9).
 1971: Alta comedia, episodio "Todos eran mis hijos" (Canal 9).
 1971: Alta comedia, episodio "Véndame su hijo" (Canal 9).
 1971: Alta comedia, episodio "De carne somos" (Canal 9).
 1972: Alta comedia, episodio "La sombra" (Canal 9).
 1972: Alta comedia, episodio "Como tú me deseas" (Canal 9).
 1972: Estación Retiro (Canal 9), como Andrea Adalguía
 1973: Alta comedia, episodio "Panorama desde el puente" (Canal 9), como Beatrice
 1973: Alta comedia, episodio "Cuando estemos casados" (Canal 9), como María
 1973: ¡Qué vida de locos! (Canal 9), como Inés
 1974: Alta comedia, episodio "El mar profundo y azul" (Canal 9).
 1974: Alta comedia, episodio "Pasión en Mallorca" (Canal 9).
 1974: Alta comedia, episodio "La casa de los siete balcones" (Canal 9).
 1974: Alta comedia, episodio "De Bécquer con amor" (Canal 9).
 1974: Alta comedia, episodio "Cartas de amor" (Canal 9).
 1974: Alta comedia, episodio "Alfonsina" (Canal 9).
 1974: Teatro para sonreír (Canal 11).
 1974: Narciso Ibáñez Serrador presenta a Narciso Ibáñez Menta, episodio "La zarpa" (Canal 11), como Teresa
 1974: Narciso Ibáñez Serrador presenta a Narciso Ibáñez Menta, episodio "El regreso" (Canal 11), como Teresa
 1975: Tu rebelde ternura, serie de televisión (Canal 13).
 1976 o 1979: La posada del sol, serie de televisión (Canal 13).
 1977: Aventura 77, miniserie de televisión (Canal 13).
 1978: Nuestro encuentro (Canal 9).
 1979: El león y la rosa, serie de televisión (Canal 13), como Clara
 1979: Propiedad horizontal, serie de televisión (Canal 9), como Mónica Dalton.
 1980: Hombres en pugna, película de televisión.
 1981: Los especiales de ATC (Hombres en pugna" (ATC).
 1981: Laura mía (ATC), como Caridad.
 1982: Nosotros y los miedos, serie de televisión, episodio "Miedo a los jóvenes" (Canal 9), como Antonia.
 1982: Nosotros y los miedos, episodio "Miedo a recomenzar" (Canal 9), como Virginia.
 1982: Nosotros y los miedos, episodio "Miedo a la traición" (Canal 9), como Haydée.
 1982: Nosotros y los miedos, episodio "Miedo a asumir las responsabilidades" (Canal 9), como farmacéutica.
 1982: Nosotros y los miedos, episodio "Miedo a la violencia" (Canal 9), como Teresa.
 1982: Nosotros y los miedos, episodio "Miedo a la desilusión " (Canal 9), como Berta.
 1982: Nosotros y los miedos, episodio "Miedo a las culpas" (Canal 9), como Graciela.
 1982: Nosotros y los miedos, episodio "Miedo al abandono" (Canal 9), como Raquel.
 1982: Nosotros y los miedos, episodio "Miedo a equivocarse" (Canal 9), como Isabel.
 1982: Nosotros y los miedos, episodio "Miedo a la injusticia" (Canal 9), como Margarita.
 1982: Nosotros y los miedos, episodio "Miedo a compartir" (Canal 9), como Elia.
 1982: Nosotros y los miedos, episodio "Miedo al régimen" (Canal 9), como Isabel.
 1982: Nosotros y los miedos, episodio "Miedo a afrontar" (Canal 9). como Elena.
 1982: Nosotros y los miedos, episodio "Miedo a los demás" (Canal 9), como Lidia.
 1982: Nosotros y los miedos, episodio "Miedo al análisis" (Canal 9), como Berta.
 1982: Nosotros y los miedos, episodio "Miedo a la infidelidad" (Canal 9), como Inés.
 1982: Nosotros y los miedos, episodio "Miedo al mundo" (Canal 9), como Irene.
 1982: Nosotros y los miedos, episodio "Miedo a cumplir con el deber" (Canal 9), como madre de Fernando.
 1982: Nosotros y los miedos, episodio "Miedo a dar" (Canal 9), como Rosario.
 1982: Nosotros y los miedos, episodio "Miedo a decidir" (Canal 9), como Aída.
 1982: Nosotros y los miedos, episodio "Miedo a la paz" (Canal 9), como Inés.
 1982: Nosotros y los miedos, episodio "Miedo a ver" (Canal 9), como Esther.
 1982: Nosotros y los miedos, episodio "Miedo a reintegrarse" (Canal 9), como Aída.
 1982: Nosotros y los miedos, episodio "Miedo al cáncer" (Canal 9), como Sonia.
 1983: Nosotros y los miedos, episodio "Miedo a la vejez" (Canal 9), como Amanda.
 1983: Nosotros y los miedos, episodio "Miedo a la mediocridad" (Canal 9), como María.
 1983: Nosotros y los miedos, episodio "Miedo a la realidad" (Canal 9), como Nieves.
 1983: Nosotros y los miedos, episodio "Miedo a denunciar" (Canal 9), como Irene.
 1983: El sillón de Rivadavia (ganadora del Premio Santa Clara de Asís en 1983).
 1985: El puente de coral vivo (Canal 13).
 1985: La única noche, serie de televisión (ATC).
 1986: Navidad: variaciones sobre un mismo tema (ATC).
 1986: Situación límite, episodio "Exámenes" (ATC).
 1986: Soñar sin límite (ATC).
 1987–1989: De fulanas y menganas (ATC).
 1990–1991: Atreverse, serie de televisión (Telefé).
 1991: Socorro, sobrinos (ATC).
 1992: Amores 1992: El precio del poder'' (Canal 9).

External links

 
Vascos en la Argentina: Olga Zubarry (in Spanish)

References

1929 births
2012 deaths
Argentine film actresses
Argentine television actresses
Argentine people of Basque descent
Actresses from Buenos Aires
Silver Condor Award for Best Actress winners
20th-century Argentine actresses